Shigenaga (written: 重長, 重永 or 繁長) is a masculine Japanese given name. Notable people with the name include:

, Japanese golfer
Edo Shigenaga, Japanese noble
, Japanese samurai
, Japanese samurai
, Japanese samurai
, Japanese ukiyo-e artist

Japanese masculine given names